Felt is the fourth studio album by Canadian band Suuns. It was released on March 2, 2018 under Secretly Canadian.

Release
On January 11, 2018, the band announced their new album, along with the first single "Watch You, Watch Me". On May 15, 2018, the music video for "Look No Further" was released.

Production
The album was recorded at Breakglass Studio's in Montreal, Quebec, and mixed by Grammy Award-winning producer John Congleton.

Tour
Suuns announced a worldwide tour from February 2018 to April 2018, starting at Saint-Casimir, Quebec and finishing in Istanbul, Turkey.

Critical reception
Felt was met with "generally favorable" reviews from critics. At Metacritic, which assigns a weighted average rating out of 100 to reviews from mainstream publications, this release received an average score of 70, based on 15 reviews. Aggregator Album of the Year gave the release a 70 out of 100 based on a critical consensus of 11 reviews.

Accolades

Track listing

Personnel

Musicians
 Ben Shemie – vocals
 Max Henry – vocals
 Liam O'Neill
 Jace Lasek – backing vocals
 Ted Crosby – saxophone

Production
 John Congleton – mixer, producer
 Dave Smith – engineer
 Ryan Morey – mastering
 Brian Chase – design

Charts

References

External links
 Felt at Secretly Canadian

2018 albums
Suuns albums
Secretly Canadian albums
Albums produced by John Congleton